John Lachlan Taylor (January 10, 1895 – May 1, 1971) was a professional football player who played in the National Football League with the Chicago Staleys, Canton Bulldogs, Brooklyn Lions and the Brooklyn Horsemen. Taylor won an American Professional Football Association championship in 1921, with the Staleys, the forerunners of the Chicago Bears. Taylor won another championship in 1922 with the Bulldogs. He finished his career in 1926, playing for the Lions-Horsemen.

References

1895 births
Sportspeople from Superior, Wisconsin
Players of American football from Wisconsin
Players of American football from Ohio
Canton Bulldogs players
Chicago Staleys players
Brooklyn Lions players
Brooklyn Horsemen players
Ohio State Buckeyes football players
1971 deaths